Dactylia varia is a species of sponge in the family Callyspongiidae.

They are omnivores. They also reproduce sexually.

It has been found near New Zealand and Australia.

References 

Sponges of New Zealand
Sponges of Australia
Callyspongiidae